California is a 1977 Italo-Spanish Spaghetti Western film directed by Michele Lupo. The film was generally well received by critics and obtained a good commercial success at Italian box office.

Plot
After the American Civil War gunman California wants to renew his life. He changes his name to Michael Random and seeks a home where he can live in peace. In the war's aftermath he gets to know young Willy Preston. En route to Preston's family, Willy is killed by a gang of criminals under the helm of Robert Whittaker. California informs Willy's kin and falls in love with Willy's sister, Helen. One day they witness Whittaker and his gang robbing a bank; Helen is taken hostage. California is faced with the decision to resort to the merciless shootist he was during the war although it will not spare Helen the gruesome experience of being game to ruthless desperados.

Cast 
 Giuliano Gemma: Michael 'California' Random
 Miguel Bosé: Willy Preston
 Chris Avram: Nelson
 Paola Dominguín (as Paola Bose'): Helen Preston
 Robert Hundar: Eric Plummer
 Malisa Longo: Yasmin
 Dana Ghia: Mrs. Preston
 Piero Leri : 
 Mario Novelli :
 Ferdinando Murolo: Brook
 Franco Ressel: Full
 Enzo Fiermonte: Father
 Piero Morgia :
 Andrea Aureli : 
 Franco Fantasia : 
 Romano Puppo: Gary Duke
 Alfio Caltabiano : 
 William Berger: Mr. Preston
 Raimund Harmstorf: Whittaker
 Nazzareno Zamperla: Brother of Northern Soldier (uncredited)

References

External links
 
 The Spaghetti Western Database

1977 films
Films directed by Michele Lupo
Spaghetti Western films
1977 Western (genre) films
Films shot in Almería
1970s Italian-language films
1970s Italian films